is a Japanese politician serving in the House of Representatives in the Diet (national legislature) as a member of the Constitutional Democratic Party of Japan. A native of Nagoya, Aichi he attended the University of Tokyo and also earned MBA from the Wharton School of the University of Pennsylvania. He was elected for the first time in 2003 after working at NTT for 20 years.

References

External links
 Official website in Japanese.

Living people
1961 births
People from Nagoya
Democratic Party of Japan politicians
Constitutional Democratic Party of Japan politicians
Members of the House of Representatives (Japan)
21st-century Japanese politicians